Hesar (also Romanized as Ḩeşār) is a village in Dodangeh-ye Sofla Rural District, Ziaabad District, Takestan County, Qazvin Province, Iran. At the 2006 census, its population was 388, in 104 families.

References 

Populated places in Takestan County